The zec de la Rivière-Jacques-Cartier is a "zone d'exploitation contrôlée" (controlled harvesting zone) (zec) in the municipality of Donnacona, in the Portneuf Regional County Municipality, in the administrative area of the Capitale-Nationale, in Quebec, in Canada.

Geography 
The waters descend south to the mouth that flows into the St. Lawrence River between Cap-Santé and Donnacona, at 30 kilometers west of Quebec city. A lower segment of 41 km of the river is managed by the "zec de la Rivière-Jacques-Cartier".

The Jacques-Cartier River drains a watershed of :

The course of the river is mainly in forested area. However, the last segment of the path of the river is generally in agriculture (some forested areas) and the river pass through different villages (from the north): Vacation Village of Valcaltier, Shannon, Sainte-Catherine-de-la-Jacques-Cartier, Pont-Rouge and Donnacona.

Territory of Zec

A  segment of the river under the administration of the zec begins at the mouth of the Jacques-Cartier River upstream to Shannon, located near the CFB Valcartier. The top part, segments of the river under the aegis of Zec are discontinuous. The upper limit of the zec is just north of the bridge Railway CN in Shannon. The river segment administered by the zec counts 46 small islands.

Toponymy 

The names "Zec de la Rivière-Jacques-Cartier", the "Jacques-Cartier National Park" and the La Jacques-Cartier Regional County Municipality are directly related to the name of the river and lake head. This name was formalized on June 7, 1991, at the Bank of place names of the Commission de toponymie du Québec (Geographical Names Board of Quebec).

See also 

 Donnacona, a municipality
 Portneuf Regional County Municipality
 Jacques-Cartier River
 Saint-Raymond, a municipality
 Laurentides Wildlife Reserve (Réserve faunique des Laurentides)
 Portneuf Regional County Municipality
 Capitale-Nationale, administrative region of Quebec
 Zone d'exploitation contrôlée (controlled harvesting zone) (ZEC)

References 

Protected areas established in 1991
Protected areas of Capitale-Nationale
1991 establishments in Quebec